The Vinegar Tasters is a traditional subject in Chinese painting, and later spread to other East Asian countries. The allegorical composition depicts the three founders of China's major religious and philosophical traditions: Confucianism, Buddhism, and Taoism.

The three men are dipping their fingers in a vat of vinegar and tasting it; one man reacts with a sour expression, one reacts with a bitter expression, and one reacts with a sweet expression. The three men are Confucius, Buddha, and Laozi, respectively. Each man's expression represents the predominant attitude of his philosophy: Confucianism saw life as sour, in need of rules to correct the degeneration of people; Buddhism saw life as bitter, dominated by pain and suffering due to the attachment to possessions and material desires; and Taoism saw life as sweet due to it being fundamentally perfect in its natural state. Another interpretation of the painting is that, since the three men are gathered around one vat of vinegar, the "three teachings" are one.

Origin

Interpretations

Confucianism
Confucianism saw life as sour, in need of rules to correct the degeneration of people, and the present was out of step of the past and that the government and the people had no understanding of the way of Heaven—the right response was to worship the ancestors.

Confucianism, being concerned with the outside world, viewed the vinegar as "polluted wine".

Buddhism
Buddhism was founded by Siddhartha Gautama, who claimed to be enlightened when he was thirty-five years old. Siddhartha lived a very sheltered and extravagant life growing up. As he neared his thirties it is said that he became aware of all the ugliness in the world, this prompted him to leave his home in search of enlightenment. At the start of his travels Siddhartha became a beggar and studied philosophy; however, his studies did not lead him to the answers that he sought. He then tried asceticism alongside five monks for six years; this practice also failed to bring him enlightenment. After giving up asceticism, Siddhartha decided to meditate until he found the enlightenment that he was searching for. After much meditation, he became enlightened and was henceforth known as Buddha, which means 'awakened one'. During his meditation he had a vision of humankind and the cycle that we are bound to. He concluded that we are bound to the cycles of life and death because of tanha (desire, thirst, craving). During Buddha's first sermon he preached, "neither the extreme of indulgence nor the extremes of asceticism was acceptable as a way of life and that one should avoid extremes and seek to live in the middle way". "Thus the goal of basic Buddhist practice is not the achievement of a state of bliss in some heaven but the extinguishing of tanha. When tanha is extinguished, one is released from the cycle of life (birth, suffering, death, and rebirth)", only then will they achieve Nirvana.

One interpretation is that Buddhism, being concerned with the self, viewed the vinegar as a polluter of the taster's body due to its extreme flavor. Another interpretation for the image is that Buddhism reports the facts as they are, that vinegar is vinegar and isn't naturally sweet on the tongue. Pretending it is sweet is denying what it is, while the equally harmful opposite is being disturbed by the sourness.

Taoism (Daoism)

Taoism sees life as sweet due to it being fundamentally perfect in its natural state.

In the vinegar tasters picture, Laozi's (Lao Tzu) expression is sweet because of how the teachings of Taoism view existence. Every natural thing is intrinsically good as long as it remains true to its nature.  This perspective allows Laozi to experience the taste of vinegar without judging it.  "Ah this," he might be thinking, "this is vinegar!"  From such a perspective, the taste doesn't need to be sweet, sour, bitter or bland.  It is simply the taste of vinegar.  By openly experiencing vinegar as vinegar, Laozi acknowledges and participates in the harmony of nature.  As this is the very goal of Taoism, whatever the taste of vinegar, the experience is good.

At the core of Taoist doctrine is the concept of the Tao or "the way".  According to Taoist philosophy, everything originates from Tao. Tao is all embracing, existing anywhere and everywhere though it is invisible.  It gives birth to the all, which then gives birth to everything in it.  The Tao in this sense is the way of the everything, the driving power behind all.

See also
 East Asian philosophy
 Three laughs at Tiger Brook

References

 Hopfe, Lewis M; revised by Woodward, Mark R. "Religions of the World". Pearson Prentice Hall. 2007. p 176. 
 Ji, Sang. Religions and Religious Life in China. China Intercontinental Press, 2004.
 Smith, Huston. The World's Religions. New York: Harper Collins Publishers Inc., 1958.

External links
 

Three teachings
Chinese painting
Vinegar